Brian Walters  is a prominent Melbourne barrister, writer and advocate for human rights and the environment.

Early career

Walters was born on 17 June 1954, the third of four sons born to Neville and Jean Walters. He was educated at Blackburn State School, Carey Baptist Grammar School, and Monash University, where he undertook a Bachelor of Arts and Bachelor of Laws. After completing articles at Melbourne's McCracken and McCracken, Walters practised as a solicitor with the large country law firm, Warren Graham & Murphy, based in Bairnsdale. One of his major clients there was the Australian Timber Workers Union (now the Forestry Division of the CFMMEU).

While in Bairnsdale, in 1980-1 he helped Chris Baxter and Michael Collie found Wild – Australia's wilderness adventure magazine. He was to remain a contributing editor and a director for the next 25 years.

Professional career

In 1982 Brian Walters returned to Melbourne and signed the roll of counsel at the Victorian Bar.

At the end of 1982 and into 1983 Walters rafted down the Franklin River to join the Franklin Blockade. He had been involved in the campaign to save the Franklin for some years.

In 1992 he was a founding member of the Greens in Victoria.

Walters has advised and appeared in numerous human rights and environmental cases,
including acting for Senator Bob Brown in 1998 when he was prosecuted for obstructing lawful forest operations in Goolengook, successfully arguing that the forest operations in East
Gippsland were unlawful.

In 1999 Walters advised journalist Alan Gray in relation to his book Forest Friendly Building Timbers after the National Association of Forest Industries threatened to sue because it criticised logging practices. He subsequently joined the committee of Free Speech Victoria, becoming its Vice President and Spokesperson.

Walters joined the committee of Liberty Victoria in 2001, the same year he took silk, and served as vice president from 2002 to 2004 and president from 2004 to 2006, when he was succeeded by Julian Burnside AO QC. During his term as president Walters actively campaigned on issues such as the terror laws, the treatment of Jack Thomas and David Hicks, the proposal to introduce an identity card in Australia, the mandatory detention of asylum seekers, as well as police shootings and corruption.

In 2006-7 Walters led the legal team that took the case of Stefan Nystrom to the United Nations Human Rights Committee. On 18 July 2011 the Committee found in favour of Mr Nystrom, who had been deported from Australia. It ruled that, even though Mr Nystrom was a Swedish citizen, Australia was his 'own country' under international human rights law.

In 2009–10 Walters led the legal team that successfully sued the South Australian government for assaults and false imprisonment perpetrated by South Australian
police against protesters at the Beverley Uranium Mine in 2000 (White v South Australia).

He was the Greens candidate for the state seat of Melbourne in the 2010 Victorian state election.

In 2014 Make Books Australia published his book 'TREASON: Claus von Stauffenberg and the Plot to Kill Hitler'. With film, slide shows, and audio, the book was the first dynamically interactive history book for the iPad.

In 2015–2016 Walters led the legal team that successfully argued in the Federal Court that the Tasmanian government could not open four wheel drive tracks through the Western Tasmanian Aboriginal Cultural Landscape (the Tarkine Tracks case).

In 2016–2017 Walters led the legal team that successfully challenged a series of decisions by the
Andrews Victorian government to hold children in an adult prison (the 'Barwon case').

In 2017 Walters led the legal team appearing for former Greens parliamentarians in the case
before the High Court relating to dual citizenship of parliamentarians (the s 44 case – Re
Canavan & Ors).

In the 2017 Australia Day Honours list Walters was made a Member of the Order of Australia (AM) "for significant service to conservation through environmental protection law, and to human rights advocacy in Victoria."

In 2018-20 he led the Australian arm of the team acting for Torres Strait Islanders in their case before the United Nations Human Rights Committee concerning Australia’s violation of their human rights by inaction on climate change. 

Walters is a poet, and in 2019 his volume Angels, like laundry, was launched by poet Mark Tredinnick.

His second poetry book, Brink, was published in 2020.

In 2021 the hard copy version of Treason was published.

His third poetry book, Mothlight, was published in 2022.

Personal life

Walters married Sally Polmear (daughter of Professor Ian Polmear and Valerie Polmear) on 21 December 1985. They have two children.

Bibliography
Books
 Slapping on the Writs: Defamation, Developers and Community Activism, Brian Walters. University of South Wales Press, 2003. .
 TREASON: Claus von Stauffenberg and the Plot to Kill Hitler, Brian Walters, 2021 Treason,  
 Angels, like laundry, Brian Walters, Angels, like laundry 2019 Make Books Australia, 
 Brink, Brian Walters, Brink 2020 Make Books Australia, 
 Mothlight, Brian Walters, Mothlight 2022 Make Books Australia  
Screenplays
Jumping Jack (short film 2008)

Notes

External links
 brianwalters.com.au
  Brian Walters blog
 Liberty Victoria
  Victorian Council for Civil Liberties Incorporated v Minister for Immigration & Multicultural Affairs & Ors V 899 of 2001. Statement of judgement (brief version)
 Perspective Notes about a short radio talk given by Walters on Australian radio on the subject of "Slapping on the Writs".

Lawyers from Melbourne
Australian human rights activists
Living people
1954 births
People educated at Carey Baptist Grammar School
Australian Greens candidates
Australian King's Counsel
Members of the Order of Australia
Australian poets
Australian barristers